Haplogroup K2a may refer to:
 Haplogroup K2a (Y-DNA)
 Haplogroup K2a (mtDNA), a subclade of Haplogroup K (mtDNA)